, commonly abbreviated to "AiAra", is the twenty-first single of J-pop group Morning Musume; both the single itself and the Single V were released on January 21, 2004. It sold a total of 108,368 copies, reaching a peak of #2 on the weekly Oricon charts and charting for seven weeks, while the Single V reached a peak of #6 and charted for eight weeks on the Oricon DVD charts. The single placed 89th on the overall year's chart for 2004. The single also marked the graduation of one of the founding members of Morning Musume, Natsumi Abe, who also went on to have a solo career within Hello! Project. The limited edition comes with a 52-page photobook featuring the members and comes in the special packaging what Hello Project solo singers and bands have used before.

The B-side, "Dekiru Onna", features a vocal and instrumental arrangement heavily inspired by Queen.

The single was certified Gold by RIAJ for physical sales of over 100,000 units.

Track listings
 
Lyrics & composition: Tsunku / arrangement: Takao Konishi
 
Lyrics & composition: Tsunku / arrangement: Shunsuke Suzuki
 "Ai Araba It's All Right" (Instrumental)

Members at time of single 
1st generation: Kaori Iida, Natsumi Abe 
2nd generation: Mari Yaguchi
4th generation: Rika Ishikawa, Hitomi Yoshizawa, Nozomi Tsuji, Ai Kago
5th generation: Ai Takahashi, Asami Konno, Makoto Ogawa, Risa Niigaki
6th generation: Miki Fujimoto, Eri Kamei, Sayumi Michishige, Reina Tanaka

Personnel
Kaori Iida – center vocals
Natsumi Abe – main vocals
Mari Yaguchi – center vocals
Rika Ishikawa – center vocals
Hitomi Yoshizawa – center vocals
Nozomi Tsuji – minor vocals
Ai Kago – main vocals
Ai Takahashi – main vocals
Asami Konno – minor vocals
Makoto Ogawa – center vocals
Risa Niigaki – center vocals
Miki Fujimoto – center vocals
Eri Kamei – center vocals
Sayumi Michishige – minor vocals
Reina Tanaka – center vocals

Track 1
Takao Konishi – programming
Tsuyoshi Katsuura – manipulator
Shirō Sasaki – trumpet
Wakaba Kawai – trombone
Takahiro Kaneko – tenor saxophone
Kōju Yamamoto – alto saxophone

Track 2
Shunsuke Suzuki – programming & guitar
Sting Miyamoto – bass
Yasuharu Nakanishi – Hammond organ
Atsuko Inaba – chorus

References

External links 
 Ai Araba It's All Right at the Up-Front Works official website
Ai Araba It's All Right Single V entry at the Up-Front Works official website
Ai Araba It's All Right listing & comments on Tsunku's official website (Japanese)

Morning Musume songs
Zetima Records singles
2004 singles
Songs written by Tsunku
Song recordings produced by Tsunku
Japanese-language songs
2004 songs